Margi Geerlinks (born 1970) is a Dutch photographer.

Born in Kampen, Overijssel, Geerlinks lives and works in Rotterdam. She graduated from the Rietveld Academy in 1991, the Art Academy Constantyn Huygens in 1995, and the Masters Program at the Sandberg Institute in 1997. Her work is described as being "concerned with the ways the human species creates an identity for themselves, and the forces that seem to govern this process", and she digitally manipulates her photographs to achieve the desired effect.

A 1999 work by Geerlinks, Untitled, is owned by the Mint Museum. Her photograph Eve II was donated to the National Museum of Women in the Arts by Heather and Tony Podesta. The museum also owns the 2001 work Living Dolls, which was formerly in the collection of the Corcoran Gallery of Art.

References

1970 births
Living people
20th-century women photographers
21st-century women photographers
20th-century Dutch women artists
21st-century Dutch women artists
20th-century Dutch photographers
21st-century Dutch photographers
Dutch women photographers
People from Kampen, Overijssel
Gerrit Rietveld Academie alumni